Saprotrophic nutrition  or lysotrophic nutrition is a process of chemoheterotrophic extracellular digestion involved in the processing of decayed (dead or waste) organic matter. It occurs in saprotrophs, and is most often associated with fungi (for example Mucor) and soil bacteria. Saprotrophic microscopic fungi are sometimes called saprobes; saprotrophic plants or bacterial flora are called saprophytes (sapro- 'rotten material' + -phyte 'plant'), although it is now believed that all plants previously thought to be saprotrophic are in fact parasites of microscopic fungi or other plants. The process is most often facilitated through the active transport of such materials through endocytosis within the internal mycelium and its constituent hyphae.

Various word roots relating to decayed matter (detritus, sapro-), eating and nutrition (-vore, -phage), and plants or life forms (-phyte, -obe) produce various terms, such as detritivore, detritophage, saprotroph, saprophyte, saprophage, and saprobe; their meanings overlap, although technical distinctions (based on physiologic mechanisms) narrow the senses. For example, usage distinctions can be made based on macroscopic swallowing of detritus (as an earthworm does) versus microscopic lysis of detritus (as a mushroom does).

Process
As matter decomposes within a medium  in which a saprotroph is residing, the saprotroph breaks such matter down into its composites.
 Proteins are broken down into their amino acid composites through the breaking of peptide bonds by proteases.
 Lipids are broken down into fatty acids and glycerol by lipases.
 Starch is broken down into pieces of simple disaccharides by amylases.
 Cellulose, a major portion of plant cells, and therefore a major constituent of decaying matter is broken down into glucose

These products are re-absorbed into the hypha through the cell wall by endocytosis and passed on throughout the mycelium complex. This facilitates the passage of such materials throughout the organism and allows for growth and, if necessary, repair.

Conditions
In order for a saprotrophic organism to facilitate optimal growth and repair, favourable conditions and nutrients must be present. Optimal conditions refers to several conditions which optimise the growth of saprotrophic organisms, such as;

 Presence of water: 80–90% of the mass of the fungi is water, and the fungi require excess water for absorption due to the evaporation of internally retained water.
 Presence of oxygen: Very few saprotrophic organisms can endure anaerobic conditions as evidenced by their growth above media such as water or soil.
 Neutral-acidic pH: The condition of neutral or mildly acidic conditions under pH 7 are required. 
 Low-medium temperature: The majority of saprotrophic organisms require temperatures between 1 °C and 35 °C (33.8 °F and 95 °F), with optimum growth occurring at 25 °C (77 °F).

The majority of nutrients taken in by such organisms must be able to provide carbon, proteins, vitamins and, in some cases, ions. Due to the carbon composition of the majority of organisms, dead and organic matter provide rich sources of disaccharides and polysaccharides such as  maltose and starch, and of the monosaccharide glucose.

In terms of nitrogen-rich sources, saprotrophs require combined protein for the creation of proteins, which is facilitated by the absorption of amino acids, and usually taken from rich soil. Although both ions and vitamins are rare, thiamine or ions such as potassium, phosphorus, and magnesium aid the growth of the mycelium.

See also

 Chemoautotrophic nutrition
 Decomposers
 Detritivore
 Holozoic nutrition
 Mycorrhizal fungi and soil carbon storage
 Parasitic nutrition
 Photoautotrophic nutrition
 Saprotrophic bacteria
 Wood-decay fungus

References

Further reading
 
 

Nutrition by type
Mycology
Dead wood